U of K may refer to:

a university in Sudan
 University of Khartoum

a university in the United States
 University of Kansas
 University of Kentucky

See also
 UK (disambiguation)